Barbasphecia is a genus of moths in the family Sesiidae.

Species
Barbasphecia ares Pühringer & Sáfián, 2011
Barbasphecia hephaistos Pühringer & Sáfián, 2011

References

Sesiidae